Willi Petzold (6 September 1885 – 16 March 1978) was a German painter. His work was part of the painting event in the art competition at the 1936 Summer Olympics.

References

External links
 

1885 births
1978 deaths
20th-century German painters
20th-century German male artists
German male painters
Olympic competitors in art competitions
Artists from Mainz